Tendai Shereni (born 5 September 1988) is a Zimbabwean cricketer who played two List A matches for Mashonaland Eagles.

References

External links
 

1988 births
Living people
Zimbabwean cricketers
Mashonaland Eagles cricketers
Sportspeople from Harare